Steve Passeur, pen name of Étienne Morin, was a French dramatist and screenwriter. His plays with scathing replicas often depicted cynical characters.

Prior to 1940, Steve Passeur was considered as an author of the avant-garde, whose works were staged and played by Louis Jouvet, Charles Dullin, Georges and Ludmilla Pitoëff.

He was married to the comedian Renée Passeur.

Theatre 
Dramatist

1925: La Maison ouverte, 3 acts play
1925: La Traversée de Paris à la nage, Paris, Maison de l'Œuvre
1925: Un bout de fil coupé en deux
1927: Pas encore, Paris, Atelier 
1927: Le Nord-Sud de 10h12
1928: À quoi penses-tu ?, Atelier
1928: Le Refuge du prophète
1928: Tranquillité
1929: Suzanne, 3 acts comedy, mise-en-scène Louis Jouvet, Comédie des Champs-Élysées
1930: L'Acheteuse
1931: La Chaine, 3 acts play
1931: Défense d'afficher
1932: Les Tricheurs, 3 acts play, Théâtre de l'Atelier
1933: Une vilaine femme, 3 acts play, Théâtre de l'Œuvre 
1933: Quand le vin est tiré
1934: L'Amour gai, 3 acts comedy
1935: Je vivrai un grand amour
1935: Dieu sait pourquoi
1935: Le pavillon brûle
1936: Le Témoin, 3 acts play
1936: Un train à prendre
1937: Le Château de cartes
1937: La Pêche aux flambeaux
1939: Réflexion faite
1941: Le Paradis perdu
1941: Marché noir
1946: La Traitresse
1947: Le Vin du souvenir, 
1947: Je vivrai un grand amour 3 act play, Théâtre des Mathurins
1948: 107''', comédie en 3 actes. Bruxelles, Palais des beaux-arts 
1952: Une vilaine femme, Paris, Théâtre de l'Œuvre
1954: N'importe quoi pour elle, 3 act play, mise-en-scène Georges Douking, Théâtre Gramont
1968: La Moitié du plaisir de Steve Passeur, Jean Serge, Robert Chazal, direction Robert Hossein, Théâtre Antoine, Théâtre des Variétés

 Filmography 
Screenwriter and dialoguist
 1932: Suzanne, by Léo Joannon and Raymond Rouleau
 1932: Panurge by Michel Bernheim
 1936: Port-Arthur, by Nicolas Farkas
 1936: Nitchevo, by Jacques de Baroncelli
 1937: Feu! by Jacques de Baroncelli
 1937: Beethoven's Great Love, by Abel Gance
 1938: J'accuse!, by Abel Gance
 1938: La Tragédie impériale, by Marcel L'Herbier
 1939: Entente cordiale, by Marcel L'Herbier
 1939: Louise, by Abel Gance
 1939:  The White Slave, by Marc Sorkin
 1940: Paradise Lost, by Abel Gance
 1941: Vénus aveugle, by Abel Gance
 1941: The Pavilion Burns, by Jacques de Baroncelli
 1943: Captain Fracasse, by Abel Gance
 1944: Sowing the Wind, by Maurice Gleize
 1949: Mademoiselle de La Ferté, by Roger Dallier
 1961: The Game of Truth, by Robert Hossein

 Bibliography 
 Basile Ratiu, L'Œuvre dramatique de Steve Passeur'', Paris, Klincksieck, 1964.

External links  
 Steve Passeur par Jean-Jacques Bricaire
 

French male dramatists and playwrights
French male screenwriters
20th-century French screenwriters
People from Sedan, Ardennes
1966 deaths
20th-century French male writers
1899 births